Shah Jahan may refer to:

People
 Shah Jahan (1592–1666), ruler of the Mughal Empire in the Indian subcontinent from 1628 until 1658
 Shah Jahan II (1696–1719), Mughal emperor
 Shah Jahan III (1711–1772), Mughal emperor
 Shah Jahan I (1838–1901), Queen of Bhopal from 1868 until 1901
 Shah Jahan (politician) (born 1952), Pakistani politician
 Shajahan Khan (born 1952), Bangladesh Awami League politician and former Shipping Minister
 Shahjahan Mia, Bangladesh Awami League politician and former Religious Affairs Minister
 Shahjahan Omar, Bangladesh Nationalist Party politician
 Shajahan Siraj (1943–2020), Bangladeshi politician
 Shajahan Khan (Patuakhali politician), Bangladesh Nationalist Party politician

Buildings
 Shah Jahan Mosque, Thatta,  a 17th-century building that serves as the central mosque for the city of Thatta
 Shah Jahan Mosque, Woking, first purpose-built mosque in the United Kingdom

Film
 Shahjehan, a 1946 Indian Hindi film about the Mughal emperor
 Shahjahan, a 2001 Indian Tamil film starring Vijay
 Shah Jahan Regency, an Indian Bengali drama film